Shadaab Khan (born 20 September 1973) is an Indian Hindi film actor, writer, and film director. He is the son of actor Amjad Khan.

Personal life
Shadaab Khan was born on 20 September 1973 in Bombay, Maharashtra, India (now Mumbai) into a Muslim family to parents Amjad Khan and Shaila Khan. Shadaab is of Pashtun descent on his father's side, traced back to Peshawar, North-West Frontier Province (now in Khyber Pakhtunkhwa, Pakistan), where his grandfather Zakaria Khan, better known as Jayant was born and raised. He has two siblings Seemaab Khan and Ahlam Khan. He is married to Rumana Achwa since 2005.

Books
Shadaab Khan has written two books: Shanti Memorial in 2013 and Murder in Bollywood, a crime novel, in 2015.

Filmography

Films

Television

References

External links 
 
 

Living people
Indian people of Pashtun descent
Indian male film actors
Male actors in Hindi cinema
1973 births